Camponogara is a town in the Metropolitan City of Venice, Veneto, Italy. It is west of SP13, not far from the nearby Brenta river. Economy is based on the production of wine, including Cabernet and Merlot, and manufacturing of shoes and leather products.

Camponogara is split into different frazioni: Premaore, Camponogara, Calcroci and Campoverardo.

History
The name of the town derives from Latin by the words campus and nux ("field" and "walnut"), later simplified by Venetian language to Camponogara. That name stands as a witness of the ancient plantations typical of the territory.

The name of the frazione of Campoverardo derives from the Germanic name Eberhard, probably a famous man that visited that territory during the 7th century. That of Prozzolo comes from the Latin word praedium ("little agricultural fund"),  while Premaore is translated in "prato maggiore" ("biggest field").

Main sights
Church of Santi Maria Assunta e Prosdocimo, in the city center.
 Church of Santi Quirico e Giulitta, in Campoverardo.
 Oratory of Beata Vergine del Rosario, in Campoverardo.
 Church of San Michele Arcangelo, in Prozzolo
Church of San Giovanni Battista, in Premaore.

Culture

The comprehensive institute "Antonio Gramsci" is situated in Camponogara. Two kindergartens, three primary schools and one lower secondary school are part of this institution. There is also a municipal kindergarten and two equal kindergartens.

In the village there is a public library, the second of the Riviera del Brenta after that of Dolo.

In 2001, the "Università Popolare di Camponogara" was founded, which has branch offices in most of the municipalities of the Riviera del Brenta. Since 2016, it has also been active in Marcon and Brugine.

Near the town centre is  "Dario Fo'" Theatre,  housing of concerts, movies and shows.

People 
 Alessandro Terrin, Italian swimmer born in Camponogara.

Twin towns
 Fossano, Italy
 Vinkovci, Croatia

References

External links
 Università Popolare di Camponogara 
Istituto Comprensivo "Antonio Gramsci" Camponogara 

Lists of municipalities of Italy

Cities and towns in Veneto